Money in the Pocket is the debut studio album led by jazz fusion keyboardist Joe Zawinul released on the Atlantic label in 1966.

Reception

The Allmusic review awarded the album 3 stars. All About Jazz awarded the album 3½ stars, stating, "Money In The Pocket is a remarkable album—remarkable in that gives absolutely no hint of the shape shifts that would transform Zawinul's work a few years later. The first of three albums he recorded for Atlantic, it's a conventional mix of mid-1960s hard bop and soul jazz". The Guardian'''s John Fordham noted, "this session reflects the driving grooves of that popular soul-jazz style – so there are a lot of backbeats, repeating riffs, horn-harmony wailing and stagey stop-time breaks".

 Track listing All compositions by Joe Zawinul except as indicated'' 
 "Money in the Pocket" - 4:46
 "If" (Joe Henderson) - 3:47
 "My One and Only Love" (Guy Wood, Robert Mellin) - 3:52
 "Midnight Mood" - 6:06
 "Some More of Dat" (Sam Jones) - 6:02
 "Sharon's Waltz" (Rudy Stevenson) - 5:06
 "Riverbed" - 5:09
 "Del Sasser" (Jones) - 3:45

Personnel 
 Joe Zawinul – piano
 Blue Mitchell – trumpet (tracks 1, 2, 4, 5 & 7)
 Joe Henderson (tracks 2, 4, 5 & 7), Clifford Jordan (track 1) – tenor saxophone
 Pepper Adams - baritone saxophone (tracks 2, 4, 5 & 7)
 Bob Cranshaw (track 1), Sam Jones (tracks 2 & 4-8) – bass 
 Louis Hayes (tracks 2 & 4-8), Roy McCurdy (track 1) – drums

References 

1966 albums
Atlantic Records albums
Joe Zawinul albums
Albums produced by Joel Dorn